Connecticut's 101st House of Representatives district elects one member of the Connecticut House of Representatives. It consists of the town of Madison as well as parts of Durham. It has been represented by Democrat John-Michael Parker since 2021.

Recent elections

2020

2018

2016

2014

2012

References

101